Eggplant papoutsaki (Greek: μελιντζάνα παπουτσάκι) (Turkish: Patlıcan pabucaki) is an eggplant dish of the Greek cuisine and Turkish cuisine. "Papuc" or "papuç" is a Persian word "paposh" (پاپٯش) that is also used in Turkish and has the meaning of "shoe" or "slipper". The basic dish consists of eggplants which have been boiled or roasted and the tops cut off lengthwise, (which is why they resemble little shoes). The flesh is scooped out and mixed with other ingredients, sometimes ground beef, sometimes eggs, green peppers or bell peppers, green onions, tomatoes, lemon, and olive oil. It is topped with a hard, salty cheese such as kefalotyri, Mihaliç Peyniri or kasseri and grilled.

See also

 List of eggplant dishes
 List of stuffed dishes
 Karnıyarık

References

Balkan cuisine
Stuffed vegetable dishes
Greek cuisine
Cretan cuisine
Eggplant dishes
Turkish cuisine
Jewish cuisine